Samuel Atuobi Baah known professionally as Sammy Flex is a Ghanaian journalist, broadcaster and PR. He is the CEO and Chief editor of award-winning Ghanaian Entertainment newspaper Flex Newspaper. He is the communication manager for Zylofon Media and the artiste manager for highlife singer Kumi Guitar and currently the Manager for Zylofon Media (Radio and TV).

Early life and career 
Sammy was on 26 March 1980 born in Accra to Mr Emmanuel Kofi Atuobi and Madam Comfort Baah. He is the last of four siblings. 

He completed Oda Secondary School and continued to pursue a Diploma in Journalism and PR from ICM, UK. He pursued a short course in PR at the Ghana Institute of Journalism before completing Journalism and Media Studies at Manifold Institute.

Career 
Sammy started as a writer of his self-owned newspaper Flex Newspaper in May 2007, the newspaper captured all the important stories, event, interviews and the Ghanaian showbiz industry. He later become the managing Director and CEO of Flex Newspaper. Along the line, Sammy worked as a Radio and TV pundit with Happy FM, Channel R, Great FM, ETV Ghana and GTV talking about showbiz in Ghana.

In 2013, Sammy Flex joined PLUZZ FM as the host of their AM PLUZZ, a morning show that talks about showbiz in Ghana. During his times with PLUZZ FM, he hosted the Entertainment Capital show on Capital TV. He also hosted Weekend Edition on TV7 in 2016 and Atinka TV's Entertainment City in 2017. Sammy was known to have joined Okay Fm as a host of its Drive Time but was later seen with Atinka FM.

After quitting Atinka TV and FM, Sammy Flex later joined Zylofon Media as their communications manager and host of Showbiz Agenda on Zylofon FM. Currently, he is the manager for Zylofon Media where he takes care of activities of the Radio and Television station. Sammy Flex resigned as the communication manager and host of Showbiz Agenda on Zylofon FM in the year 2021. He is now the CEO of Sammy Flex TV, Ghana's Popular YouTube Channel with over 100k subscribers, that talks entertainment and more

Managing career 
NKZ Music, management of Ghanaian musician Guru confirmed Sammy Flex as a communications manager to secure event for Guru both locally and internationally as well as public relation issues. He also served as the publicist for Nacee. He was the manager for Qwarme Zaggy until he was assigned to manage highlife musician Kumi Guitar as the first signee of Zylofon Media.

Personal life 
Sammy is married to Mrs Grace Baah with three kids.

Awards and nominations

References

External links 

Living people
Ghanaian journalists
1980 births
Ghanaian broadcasters